VicForests is a Government Backed Enterprise (GBE) operating in the Australian state of Victoria. It was created – as a state body under Section 14 of the State Owned Enterprises Act 1992 – by the Victorian Government, being declared a state business corporation on 18 October 2003. Its principal function is to manage, undertake logging and commercial sale of timber in Victoria.

General overview 
VicForests is a state-owned business responsible for the sustainable harvest, regrowing and commercial sale of timber from Victoria's State Forests on behalf of the Victorian Government.

It was created – as a state body under Section 14 of the State-Owned Enterprises Act 1992 – by the Victorian Government, being declared a state business corporation on 28 October 2003.

VicForests operates within designated areas of State Forest that are managed by the Department of Energy, Environment and Climate Action (DEECA).

DEECA has custodial or ownership rights over Public Land in Victoria and is responsible for managing Victoria's entire publicly owned State Forest estate. They are also responsible for regulating compliance of VicForests' activities in accordance with the Code of Practice for Timber Production 2014 (as amended 2022) (the Code).

The organisation's purpose is to sustainably manage the state's renewable timber resources for the long term environmental, economic and social benefit of all Victorians.

Operations

Harvesting 

About 94 per cent of Victorian native forests are in protected areas that cannot be harvested or are unsuitable.

Each area planned for harvesting is subject to a detailed multi-layered planning process – including numerous computer and field-based assessments and surveys.

Before any harvesting, VicForests conducts flora, fauna and habitat surveys which inform which prescriptions are needed to protect important environmental and cultural values, including retaining hollow-bearing trees to protect species that live and dwell within them.

Change in harvesting methods 
 
VicForests plans for retention and enhancement of habitat values through protecting hollow-bearing trees, recruiting future hollow-bearing trees, connecting habitat patches and using lower intensity regeneration burning operations.

Regeneration 

VicForests regrows all harvested areas with the same type of forest that was originally there.

Post-harvest surveys shows that regenerated areas have resulted in species such as the Leadbeater's Possum being found foraging in young post-harvesting regrowth.

Certification and compliance 

VicForests conducts all its harvesting operations under the Australian Forestry Standard on sustainable forest management.

The Australian Forestry Standard is endorsed by the international Programme for the Endorsement of Forest Certification (PEFC) – the largest such system in the world which covers more than 300 million hectares of forest, has 49 national members, and equates to around two-thirds of the world's total certified forest area.

VicForests has maintained this certification since 2007, and undertakes regular independent audits to monitor its management systems and operations in accordance with the standard.

Contribution to the Victorian economy 

The native timber industry contributes hundreds of millions of dollars and thousands of jobs to regional Victoria each year

For the financial year through 2021-22 VicForests generated $88.4 million in sales across its timber operations.

2021 storm events 

On 9 and 10 June 2021 Victoria experienced a significant storm event which caused extensive damage across Gippsland, Southern Metropolitan Melbourne, the Dandenong Ranges and Central Victoria. A subsequent major storm event on 29 October 2021 caused further damage across the state.

Fire management 

Following timber harvesting activities, VicForests works with Forest Fire Management Victoria (FFMVic) to conduct controlled burning. This helps reduce the fuel hazard in harvested areas to below pre-harvest levels.

This partnership also includes the Department of Energy, Environment and Climate Action (DEECA), Parks Victoria, and Melbourne Water. VicForests also work alongside the Country Fire Authority,

VicForests must comply with bushfire zoning prescriptions in the Code of Practice for Bushfire Management on Public Land (2012) and noted in the Code of Practice for Timber Production (2014) (as amended 2022) (section 5.8).

Fire research 
 
Recent peer reviewed papers, such as Keenan et al. (2021), have found that bushfires were not made worse by timber harvesting activities. Bushfires themselves are creating the most significant change to forest age and structure. The area affected by timber harvesting is vastly smaller than the area impacted by bushfires.

Stakeholder engagement 

VicForests seeks to utilise stakeholder expertise and knowledge when planning and conducting operations and employs varied approaches to stakeholder involvement depending on specific requirements.

For example, through its Timber Release Plan and Timber Utilisation Plan

Victorian Government’s Announcement to cease native timber harvesting and Victorian Forestry Plan 

On 6 November 2019, the Victorian Government announced the transition from native timber harvesting by 2030 to a plantation-based sector as part of its Victorian Forestry Plan (VFP).

The phase out will see VicForests' total harvest levels be maintained at approximately the current levels until 2024, then reduce by around 25% in 2025, and a further 25% from 2026 to 2030.

References

2003 establishments in Australia
Companies established in 2003
Environment of Victoria (Australia)
Forest products companies of Australia
Government agencies of Victoria (Australia)
Government agencies established in 2003